Thomas Michael Bennett (born June 8, 1956) is a Republican member-designate of the Illinois Senate from the 53rd district. The 53rd district includes all or portions of Bureau, Ford, Grundy, Iroquois, LaSalle, Marshall, McLean, Peoria, Putnam, Tazewell, Will, and Woodford counties in central Illinois.

Prior to his appointment to the Illinois Senate, Bennett represented the 106th district in the Illinois House of Representatives and was Chairman of the Parkland College Board of Trustees.

Early life and career
Bennett is a lifelong resident of Gibson City. He worked at State Farm for 30 years and was previously a teacher at Melvin-Sibley High School. Tom and his wife Kathy, a retired high school teacher, have two children and four grandchildren. His nephew, Scott M. Bennett, represented Champaign–Urbana. An elected member of the Parkland College Board of Trustees, Bennett became the board's chair taking over for James L. Ayers in April 2012. Bennett was succeeded in the role by Dana Trimble. In 2016, he was selected as an elector from Illinois's 16th congressional district who would have been pledged to Donald Trump and Mike Pence had they won Illinois's 20 electoral votes.

Illinois House of Representatives
At the time, the 106th district included all or parts of Ford, Iroquois, Vermillion, Livingston and Woodford counties. During the 102nd General Assembly, Bennett was a member of the following Illinois House committees:
 Appropriations - Elementary & Secondary Education Committee (HAPE)
 Appropriations - Public Safety Committee (HAPP)
 Child Care Access & Early Child Access Committee (HCEC)
 Elementary & Secondary Education: School Curriculum & Policies (HELM)
 Law Enforcement Subcommittee (SHPF-LAWE)
 Police & Fire Committee (SHPF)

On January 28, 2020, Governor J.B. Prizker appointed Bennett to serve as a member of the Guardianship and Advocacy Commission for a term ending June 30, 2022.  He was not confirmed during the 101st General Assembly and his appointment was carried over to the 102nd General Assembly for consideration.

Illinois Senate
After the resignation of Jason Barickman, Bennett was appointed to succeed Barickman as Senator from the 53rd district for the 103rd General Assembly.

References

External links
Illinois General Assembly Profile

Living people
Businesspeople from Illinois
People from Gibson City, Illinois
Eastern Illinois University alumni
Illinois State University alumni
Nova Southeastern University alumni
Republican Party members of the Illinois House of Representatives
1956 births
21st-century American politicians
Bennett family of Illinois